Mirkovci is a village in the municipality of Čučer-Sandevo, North Macedonia.

Demographics
According to the 1467-68 Ottoman defter, Mirkovci appears as being inhabited by a Christian Albanian population. Some families had a mixed Slav-Albanian anthroponomy - usually a Slavic first name and an Albanian last name or last names with Albanian patronyms and Slavic suffixes.  

As of the 2021 census, Mirkovci had 1,165 residents with the following ethnic composition:
Macedonians 894
Serbs 77
Persons for whom data are taken from administrative sources 172
Others 16
Vlachs 6

According to the 2002 census, the village had a total of 969 inhabitants. Ethnic groups in the village include:
Macedonians 883
Serbs 72
Romani 9
Aromanians 1
Others 4

References

Villages in Čučer-Sandevo Municipality